Cecil Wray may refer to:

Cecil Wray (administrator), British resident at Pahang after Hugh Clifford
Sir Cecil Wray, 11th Baronet (c.1678–1736), High Sheriff of Lincolnshire, 1715
Sir Cecil Wray, 13th Baronet (1734–1805), British politician
Cecil J. Wray (1867–1955), New Zealand sports administrator